Pseudonacaduba aethiops, the dark line blue or dark African line blue, is a butterfly in the family Lycaenidae. It is found in Africa from Nigeria (east and the Cross River loop) to western Kenya and Zambia. The habitat consists of forests.

Adult males visit damp patches to drink.

The larvae feed on Mundulea species.

References

Seitz, A. Die Gross-Schmetterlinge der Erde 13: Die Afrikanischen Tagfalter. Plate XIII 73

Butterflies described in 1877
Polyommatini
Butterflies of Africa
Taxa named by Paul Mabille